The Politics of Dancing is the debut studio album by English new wave band Re-Flex, recorded in late 1982 and released in November 1983 by EMI Records, and was, until September 2010, their only officially released studio album. John Punter of Roxy Music fame produced the album at Utopia Studios in London, England.

The album received moderate success, charting at No. 34 in New Zealand, No. 53 in the United States, and No. 58 in West Germany, but the title track was a big international success and became the band's signature song, causing some to label them a one-hit wonder. Five other singles were released from the album with minor success in the US and UK: "Hitline", "Hurt", "Praying to the Beat", "Couldn't Stand a Day", and "Sensitive".

The album was reissued on CD in 1993 through One Way Records. Jambo Music Ltd., a division of JHP, who publish and administer Re-Flex's catalogue of songs, re-released it as part of a 6-CD box set which also contained the previously unreleased Humanication album and other previously unavailable tracks recorded before and after the band's relationship with EMI. Cherry Red Records issued a 2-CD expanded edition of this album with bonus material in 2019.

In 2017, the album's title track was prominently featured in the film Atomic Blonde.

Critical reception

Writing for Trouser Press, music journalist Terry Rompers wrote that "Re-Flex display a knack for penning strong melodies and playing walloping dance grooves, best exemplified on the title track and “Hurt.”"

In a retrospective review for AllMusic, critic Stephen Cook wrote that "the album is mostly a bland array of robotic bass and drums, effects-riddled guitars, and annoying keyboard accents. To the band's credit, the songwriting is impressive at times, especially on the title track and "Hitline," and lead singer Baxter's vocals are admirable in their own, Bowie-rehashed way. The album's future cutout-bin status, though, was sealed with aimless funk like "Jungle" and the Toto-aping MOR of "Sensitive." Approach with tongue firmly in cheek."

Track listing

Personnel
Credits are adapted from The Politics of Dancing liner notes.

Re-Flex
 Baxter — guitar; lead vocals
 Paul Fishman — electronic keyboards; backing vocals; computers
 Roland Vaughan Kerridge — electronic and acoustic drums; percussion; programming; backing vocals
 Nigel Ross-Scott — bass; backing vocals

Production and artwork
 John Punter — producer; mixing
 Pete Smith — engineer
 Andrew Carb Canelle – assistant engineer
 Chris Sheldon – assistant engineer
 Keith Breeden – design

Charts

References

External links
 

1983 debut albums
Re-Flex albums
EMI Records albums
Albums produced by John Punter